Daddy Issues may refer to:

 Daddy Issues (film), a 2018 film
 Daddy Issues (band), an American band from Nashville, Tennessee
 Daddy Issues (The Vampire Diaries), an episode of the television series The Vampire Diaries
 "Daddy issues", another name for the father complex, the psychological complex pertaining to someone's relationship with their father or the general archetype of the father
 "Daddy Issues", a song by Demi Lovato from Tell Me You Love Me
 "Daddy Issues", a song by The Neighbourhood from Wiped Out!

See also
Daddy's girl, said to have "daddy issues"